Geoff McInnes (5 February 1909 – 23 March 1988) was an Australian rules footballer who played for Melbourne and St Kilda in the Victorian Football League (VFL) during the 1930s.

Football
McInnes started out at Melbourne and kicked three goals on debut but it wasn't enough to prevent a loss to South Melbourne, for whom club great Herbie Matthews was also debuting. He didn't experience a single victory in his two seasons at Melbourne but did play in a winning side when he crossed to St Kilda in 1934.

He had success at Brunswick later in the decade and topped the VFA's goal-kicking with 84 goals in 1937.

References
Holmesby, Russell and Main, Jim (2007). The Encyclopedia of AFL Footballers. 7th ed. Melbourne: Bas Publishing.

External links

 
 Geoff A. McInnes, at The VFA Project.

1909 births
1988 deaths
Australian rules footballers from Victoria (Australia)
Australian Rules footballers: place kick exponents
Port Melbourne Football Club players
Melbourne Football Club players
St Kilda Football Club players
Brunswick Football Club players